"Moonlight on Water", also known as "Moonlight on Water (Sex on the Beach)", is a popular song written and composed by Steve Kipner, best known for writing Olivia Newton-John's "Physical", and Andy Goldmark. The song was originally recorded by Kevin Raleigh for his 1989 album Delusions of Grandeur and was released as a single. It reached No. 60 on the U.S. Billboard Hot 100 singles chart on 24 June 1989.

Charts

Laura Branigan version

The song was covered by Laura Branigan and was the first single taken from the self-titled album that she released in 1990. Her version was produced by Richard Perry. However, it was only a minor hit in the United States (reaching No. 59, one spot higher than Kevin Raleigh's version), where a music video for the song received little airplay. Branigan can be seen performing the song on her second videocassette and laserdisc concert release, Laura Branigan in Concert, which was filmed in 1990 at a tour stop in Atlantic City and initially televised as part of the syndicated TV series SRO: In Concert.

Critical reception
Bill Coleman from Billboard wrote, "Previewing the booming-voiced diva's new self-titled album is a sinfully fun popper reminiscent of earlier chart glories. Can't wait for the club remixes."

Track listings

Charts

References

Laura Branigan songs
1990 singles
Songs written by Steve Kipner
Songs written by Andy Goldmark
1989 singles
1989 songs
Atlantic Records singles